Sheilanthera is a monotypic genus of flowering plants belonging to the family Rutaceae. The only known species is Sheilanthera pubens.

It is native to the Cape Provinces in the South African Republic.

The genus name of Sheilanthera is in honour of Sheila Williams, wife and colleague of Ion James Muirhead Williams (1912–2001), a South African botanist and author of the genus. The Latin specific epithet of pubens means fuzzy or pubescent, derived from pubesco. It was first described and published in J. S. African Bot. Vol.47 on page 761 in 1981.

References

Zanthoxyloideae
Monotypic Sapindales genera
Zanthoxyloideae genera
Plants described in 1981
Flora of the Cape Provinces